Robin Matthew Brooke (born 10 December 1966 in Warkworth, New Zealand) is a former New Zealand rugby player. He played for the New Zealand national rugby union team in the 1990s, playing many tests alongside brother Zinzan Brooke.

Career
Brooke played representative rugby for Auckland, and made his All Blacks debut in June 1992 against Ireland. He played 69 games for the New Zealand national rugby union team, 62 of them tests, and scored 4 tries, all in tests. Brooke captained the Blues in the Super 12 of 2000 and 2001 and was in the Auckland NPC sides in those two seasons before retiring at the end of the 2001 season.

Personal life
Born in Warkworth, Brooke attended Mahurangi College. His older brothers Zinzan Brooke and Marty Brooke were also notable rugby players.

 he owns a New World supermarket in Warkworth, New Zealand.

In 2010, Brooke made a televised apology for allegedly groping a 15-year-old girl and grabbing her male friend by the throat whilst on holiday in Fiji. As part of a settlement he also made a contribution to charity and agreed to attend alcohol-counselling.

References

External links

1966 births
Living people
Rugby union locks
New Zealand rugby union players
Auckland rugby union players
New Zealand international rugby union players
Blues (Super Rugby) players
New Zealand Māori rugby union players
People from Warkworth, New Zealand
People educated at Mahurangi College
Rugby union players from the Auckland Region